Gordon Joseph Haworth (February 15, 1932 – September 2, 2019) was a Canadian professional ice hockey player who played two games in the National Hockey League. He played with the New York Rangers. He was inducted into the Drummondville sports hall of fame in his hometown. He is the father of Alan Haworth and Carey Haworth. He died of cancer in 2019.

References

External links

1932 births
2019 deaths
Baltimore Clippers (1945–49) players
Canadian ice hockey centres
Drummondville Rangers coaches
New York Rangers players
Sportspeople from Drummondville
Canadian ice hockey coaches